Rachel Harrison is a British computer scientist and software engineer whose research interests include mobile apps and object-oriented design. She is a professor of computer science at Oxford Brookes University.

Education and career
Harrison has master's degrees in mathematics from the University of Oxford and in computer science from University College London, and a Ph.D. in computer science from the University of Southampton. Before joining Oxford Brooks, she has been professor and head of the computer science department at the University of Reading, and a consultant in the computing industry. At Oxford Brookes University, she leads the Applied Software Engineering Group.

In 2009, Harrison became editor-in-chief of the Software Quality Journal, a position she still holds as of 2020.

References

External links

Year of birth missing (living people)
Living people
British computer scientists
British women computer scientists
British software engineers
Alumni of the University of Oxford
Alumni of University College London
Alumni of the University of Southampton
Academics of the University of Reading
Academics of Oxford Brookes University